Kannur taluk is an administrative division of Kannur district of Kerala, India.  
Kannur district is divided into five taluks, Thalassery, Kannur, Payyanur, Iritty and Taliparamba.  Thalassery has 35 villages, Kannur has 28, Payyanur has 22, Taliparamba has 28 villages and Iritty has 20 villages.

Headquarters
The taluk office of Kannur is located at South Bazar or Caltex junction in Kannur.  The headquarters is in an old British building near to the modern civil station.

Constituent villages
Kannur Taluk has 28 villages. 
 Anjarakkandy, Azhikode North, Azhikode South and Chelora
 Chembilode, Cherukkunnu and Chirakkal
 Edakkad, Elayavoor, Iriveri and Kadambur
 Kalliasseri, Kanhirode, Kannadiparamba, Kannapuram
 Kannur-1, Kannur-2, Makrery and Mattool
 Mavilayi, Munderi, Muzhappilangad and Narath
 Pallikkunnu, Pappinisseri, Puzhathi, Valapattanam and Valiyannur.

Demographics
According to census 2011, Kannur taluk has a population of 784984 of which 360086 are male and 424898 were female.

Religion

References

Geography of Kannur district
Taluks of Kerala